Chaetoderma can refer to:
 Chaetoderma (fish), a synonym for Chaetodermis, see Chaetodermis penicilligerus
 Chaetoderma (fungus), a genus of Agaricomycetes fungi
 Chaetoderma (mollusc), a genus of caudofoveate molluscs